Halilulik is a small town in West Tasifeto administrative District (kecamatan), in Belu Regency in the West Timor part of Nusa Tenggara Timur Province, Indonesia. A road connects it to Kota Atambua in the north. A RSKM hospital complex is located in Halilulik.

References

Populated places in East Nusa Tenggara
West Timor